Religious group may refer to:

 Religious denomination, a subgroup within a religion that operates under a common name, tradition, and identity
 Religious organization, an infrastructure management organization for religious activities